The 2021–22 season was the 129th season in the existence of Hertha BSC and the club's ninth consecutive season in the top flight of German football. In addition to the domestic league, Hertha BSC participated in this season's edition of the DFB-Pokal.

Players

First-team squad

Players out on loan

Transfers

In

Out

Pre-season and friendlies

Competitions

Overall record

Bundesliga

League table

Results summary

Results by round

Matches
The league fixtures were announced on 25 June 2021.

Relegation play-offs
As a result of their 16th-place finish in the regular season, the club qualified for the play-off match with the third-place team in the 2021–22 2. Bundesliga, Hamburger SV, to determine whether the club would remain in the 2022–23 Bundesliga.

DFB-Pokal

Statistics

Appearances and goals

|-
! colspan=14 style=background:#dcdcdc; text-align:center| Goalkeepers

|-
! colspan=14 style=background:#dcdcdc; text-align:center| Defenders
 

|-
! colspan=14 style=background:#dcdcdc; text-align:center| Midfielders

 

 

|-
! colspan=14 style=background:#dcdcdc; text-align:center| Forwards

 
|-
! colspan=14 style=background:#dcdcdc; text-align:center| Players transferred out during the season

Goalscorers

Last updated: 23 May 2022

References

Hertha BSC seasons
Hertha BSC